Memolli Nunatak (‘Nunatak Memolli’ \'nu-na-tak 'me-mo-li\) is the peak in Ellsworth Mountains, Antarctica rising to 2136 m at the end of the side ridge that trends 14.3 km northwestwards from the peak standing on the main crest of north-central Sentinel Range just north of Mount Hale.  It has steep and ice-free east and south slopes.

The nunatak is named after Mariano Arnaldo Memolli, Director of the Argentine National Antarctic Directorate, for his support for the Bulgarian Antarctic programme.

Location
US mapping in 1961.

Maps
 Newcomer Glacier.  Scale 1:250 000 topographic map.  Reston, Virginia: US Geological Survey, 1961.
 Antarctic Digital Database (ADD). Scale 1:250000 topographic map of Antarctica. Scientific Committee on Antarctic Research (SCAR). Since 1993, regularly updated.

Notes

References
 Memolli Nunatak. SCAR Composite Gazetteer of Antarctica.
 Bulgarian Antarctic Gazetteer. Antarctic Place-names Commission. (details in Bulgarian, basic data in English)

External links
 Memolli Nunatak. Copernix satellite image

Ellsworth Mountains
Bulgaria and the Antarctic
Nunataks of Ellsworth Land